Gilberto Mendes (13 October 1922 – 1 January 2016) was a 20th-century Brazilian avant-garde composer, and one of the pioneering fathers of the company New Consonant Music.

Biography
Gilberto Mendes was born in Santos, Brazil, in 1922. He studied piano with Antonieta Rudge and harmony with Sabino de Benedictis. The influence of Villa-Lobos is evident in his early works, in some way preceding the advent of bossa nova in his early songs. His contact with the poets of the Noigandres group gave him the ideological inspiration to feed his talent.

He later studied composition under Cláudio Santoro in 1954 and under George Olivier Toni from 1958 to 1960. In 1962 and 1968 he attended the Darmstadt International Summer Courses for New Music where he attended classes given by Pierre Boulez, Henri Pousseur, and Karlheinz Stockhausen. In 1962 he created the New Music Festival and in 1963 was a signatory of the Manifesto Música Nova (New Music Manifesto). He was a pioneer of aleatoric and concrete music in Brazil, using new musical notations and theatrical elements.

Mendes's compositions include cantatas, motets, orchestral music, incidental music, solo and chamber pieces, and some avant-garde works. Most of them are published by Alain Van Kerckhoven Editeur.

In 1965, he founded the Santos New Music Festival. In the 1970s and 1980s, he taught at the University of Wisconsin–Milwaukee and the University of Texas, then was a professor of music at the University of São Paulo (USP).

Discography
Francisco Mignone, Almeida Prado, Gilberto Mendes - I Bienal De Música Contemporânea Brasileira - Disco 3 ‎(LP)
Not On Label
SCM1003
1975

Fernando Cerqueira (2), Gilberto Mendes, Lindemberque R. Cardoso, Radamés Gnattali - ii Bienal De Musica Brasileira Contemporanea Disco 3 ‎(LP, Album)
Bienal De Música Brasileira Contemporânea
SCM-1007
1977

Dantas Leite* / Mendes* / Paraskevaídis* - La Voz, La Palabra ‎(LP, Ltd)
Tacuabé
T/E 11
1978

Gilberto Mendes ‎(LP)
Odeon
31C 063 422709
1979

Marcel Worms - Gilberto Mendes, Alicia Terzian, Emil Viklický, Burton Greene, Vincent Van Warmerdam, Jacob Ter Veldhuis, Daan Manneke, Hanna Kulenty, Various - More New Blues For Piano ‎(CD, Album)
NM Extra
98021
2001

Ricardo Tacuchian, Wayne Peterson, Christopher James (17), Raoul Pleskow, Gilberto Mendes - Carnaval / Carnival: Music From Brazil And The U.S. ‎(CD)
North/South Recordings
N/S R 1028
2002

Piano Solo: Rimsky ‎(CD-ROM)
LAMI
LAMI-003
2003

A Música de Gilberto Mendes - Vários Compositores Num Só Compositor Do Modernismo Ao Pós-Modernismo ‎(CD, Album)
Selo SESC SP
CDSS 0025/10
2010

Footnotes

References

Randel, Don M., The Harvard Biographical Dictionary of Music. Harvard, 1996, p. 576.

1922 births
2016 deaths
20th-century classical composers
20th-century male musicians
Brazilian classical composers
Brazilian male composers
Brazilian columnists
Male classical composers
University of Wisconsin–Madison faculty
University of Texas at Austin faculty
People from Santos, São Paulo